Palaung or Ta'ang, also known as De'ang, is a Austroasiatic dialect cluster spoken by over half a million people in Burma (Shan State) and neighboring countries. The Palaung people are divided into Palé, Rumai, and Shwe, and each of whom have their own language. The Riang languages are reported to be unintelligible or only understood with great difficulty by native speakers of the other Palaung languages.

A total number of speakers is uncertain; there were 150,000 Shwe speakers in 1982, 272,000 Ruching (Palé) speakers in 2000, and 139,000 Rumai speakers at an unrecorded date. Palaung was classified as a "severely endangered" language in UNESCO's Atlas of the World's Languages in Danger.Dialects

Yan and Zhou (2012)
Chinese linguists classify "De'ang 德昂" varieties (spoken mostly in Santaishan Ethnic De'ang Township 三台山德昂族乡, Mangshi and Junnong Township 军弄乡, Zhenkang County) as follows (De'angyu Jianzhi). Names in IPA are from Yan & Zhou (2012:154–155)
Bulei 布雷 (representative datapoint: Yunqian 允欠, Mangshi): spoken in Luxi
Bulei 布雷 dialect
Raojin 饶进 dialect
Liang 梁 (representative datapoint: Xiaochanggou 硝厂沟): spoken in Longchuan and Ruili
Rumai 汝买 (representative datapoint: Yechaqing 叶茶箐): spoken in Zhenkang and Baoshan

Liu (2006) documents three Palaungic lects, namely:
Guangka Village, Mengxiu Township, Ruili City (瑞丽市勐休乡广卡村); ; tonal
Mengdan Village, Santaishan Township (三台山勐丹村); ; non-tonal
Guanshuang Village, Mengman Township, Xishuangbanna (西双版纳州勐满乡关双村); ; tonal

Ostapirat (2009)
Weera Ostapirat (2009:74) classifies the Palaung languages as follows. Defining sound changes are given in parentheses.

PalaungTa-angRumai-Darang (*-ɔŋ > -ɛŋ; *-uŋ > -ɨŋ)Rumai (*-r- > -j-)
Ra-ang-Darang (*b, *d, *ɟ, *g > p, t, c, k)Ra-angDarang (*-on > -uan; *-r > -n)Na-angDarangDa-angDara-ang''

Shintani (2008)
Shintani (2008) recognizes two dialects of Palaung, namely Southern Palaung and Northern Palaung. Southern Palaung unvoiced stops correspond to Northern Palaung voiced stops, the latter which Shintani (2008) believes to be retentions from Proto-Palaungic. Southern Palaung dialects studied by Shintani (2008) are those of:

Kengtung town
Waanpao village (near Kengtung)
Chengphong village (near Kengtung)
Loikhong village (near Mängpeng)
Mängküng
Yassaw
Kalaw

Deepadung et al. (2015)
Deepadung et al. (2015) classify the Palaung dialects as follows.
Palaung
Ta-ang: Namhsan, Khun Hawt, Htan Hsan
(core Palaung)
Pule: Pang Kham, Man Loi, Meng Dan, Chu Dong Gua
Dara-ang: Pan Paw, Noe Lae, Nyaung Gone, Pong Nuea (?), Xiang Cai Tang 香菜塘
Rumai: Nan Sang, Guang Ka, Mang Bang
? Cha Ye Qing 茶叶箐

Phonology
Chen, et al. (1986) lists the following consonants for Palaung:

A final /r/ can be heard as a voiceless sound [ɹ̥], and following a /u/ it is heard as [ɫ̥].

/ɤ/ can be heard in rapid speech as a central vowel [ə], and is heard as [ɤ] elsewhere. /a/ can be heard as fronted [æ] before /k, ŋ/, and [ɛ] before /n, t/.

According to Shorto (1960), /ɤ/ does not occur alone in primary stressed syllable, but only in an unstressed syllable or as the second member of a diphthong. There are also a large number of diphthongs, including /eo/, /eɤ/, /aɤ/, /ɔɤ/, /oɤ/, /uɤ/, and /iɤ/.

Although Milne (1921) includes the vowels /ü, ö, ɪ/ in her transcriptions, Shorto (1960) did not find these as vowel phonemes in his work.

(Note that the words cited below in the Syntax section come from Milne (1921), so their phonetic representations may need revision.)

Syntax
The examples below are form Milne (1921).

Nouns and noun phrases
The order of elements in the noun phrase is N – (possessor) – (demonstrative).

Consider the following examples:

Prepositions and prepositional phrases
Shwe Palaung has prepositions, as in the following example.

Sentences
Shwe Palaung clauses generally have subject–verb–object (SVO) word order.

Text sample
The following part of a story in Shwe Palaung is from Milne (1921:146–147).

References

Sources

Further reading

 
 
 
 
 
 
 
 
  (cp. )

External links
 Palaung Thailand language site
 Palaung Ruch language site

Languages of Myanmar
Languages of China
Languages of Thailand
Palaungic languages
Palaung people